El General is a district of the Pérez Zeledón canton, in the San José province of Costa Rica. Its head village is General Viejo.

History
General Viejo's colonization began at the end of the 19th century. Manuel Estrada settled in this land in 1870. Also, Marta Durán Elizondo and her husband Trino Montero, who was known as "Don Trino", were one of the few families that founded what is now the population of the General Valley.

Geography 
El General has an area of  km² and an elevation of  metres.

Demographics 

For the 2011 census, El General had a population of  inhabitants.

Transportation

Road transportation 
The district is covered by the following road routes:
 National Route 321
 National Route 322
 National Route 326

References 

Districts of San José Province
Populated places in San José Province